Cláudia Cianci (born 7 June 1996) is a Portuguese tennis player.

Cianci has a career high WTA singles ranking of 846, achieved on 31 December 2018. She also has a career high WTA doubles ranking of 756, achieved on 26 June 2017.

Cianci made her Fed Cup debut for Portugal in 2019.

References

External links
 
 
 

1996 births
Living people
Portuguese female tennis players
21st-century Portuguese women